Ebenezer Howard Harper was a lawyer and state legislator in West Virginia.

He became a lawyer and was nominated from McDowell County. His office was in Keystone, West Virginia.

Alfred S. Paull, an insurance businessman who was active in the Republican Party, and Howard Sutherland corresponded about Harper seeking their political support.

He was elected in 1926. After he died in office governor Howard Gore appointed his wife, Minnie Buckingham Harper, to fill his seat.

See also
List of African-American officeholders (1900-1959)

References

20th-century American politicians
African-American state legislators in West Virginia
1920s deaths
Year of birth missing
Year of death uncertain
West Virginia lawyers
People from Keystone, West Virginia
Republican Party members of the West Virginia House of Delegates
African-American men in politics